Kurt Svensson (born 1940) is a Swedish retired ice hockey player. Svensson was part of the Djurgården Swedish champions' team of 1963.

References

External links

1940 births
Djurgårdens IF Hockey players
Swedish ice hockey forwards
Living people
Ice hockey people from Stockholm